A referendum on the creation of a South West Region was held in the Keffa, Sheka, Bench Sheko, Dawro, West Omo Zones, and Konta special district of the Southern Nations, Nationalities, and Peoples' Region (SNNPR) of Ethiopia on 30 September 2021 in conjunction with the 2021 Ethiopian general election.

It was the second referendum on a new regional state held in Ethiopia since Abiy Ahmed became prime minister in 2018.

Results

Aftermath
On 9 October 2021, the National Election Board of Ethiopia (NEBE) released the results of the referendum. In a turnout of nearly 94%, voters decisively approved the proposed new regional state.

The result meant that South West Ethiopia Peoples' Region became the country's 11th regional state, after it was approved by the House of Federation. It has its own regional council and constitution, enjoying a degree of autonomy enshrined in Ethiopia's constitution.

After being approved on 30 October by the House of Federation, the new region was established on 23 November 2021, and Negash Wagesho appointed to lead it.

References

South West Region
Referendums in Ethiopia
Southern Nations, Nationalities, and Peoples' Region
Administrative division referendums